Park Kyung-ik (born 13 August 1991) is a South Korean footballer who plays as midfielder for Ansan Greeners in K League Challenge.

Career
Park was selected by Ulsan Hyundai in the 2012 K League draft.

He joined Ansan Greeners ahead of the 2017 season.

References

External links 

1991 births
Living people
Association football midfielders
South Korean footballers
Ulsan Hyundai FC players
Ulsan Hyundai Mipo Dockyard FC players
Gimcheon Sangmu FC players
Ansan Greeners FC players
K League 1 players
K League 2 players
Korea National League players